Vestia roschitzi is a species of air-breathing land snail within the family Clausiliidae,

Distribution

This species is endemic to the Balkan Region with a distribution covering eastern Bulgaria, southern Serbia, northern Albania, Montenegro, and eastern Bosnia and Herzegovina. Its habitat is within mountains and foothills, living in wet deciduous forests, bushes, and rocks amongst vegetation at elevations of 500 to 2500 meters high.

Conservation 
The current subpopulations on Vestia roschitzi are assumed to be stable, and no major threats are known to effect the species, although because of its morphological forms having a localized distribution range between populations it can be easily effected by disturbances within its environment. It has been classified as 'Least concern' by the IUCN Red List, as its large distribution covers several protected areas.

Subspecies 
Placed by MolluscaBase.

 Vestia roschitzi apragmosyne (A. J. Wagner, 1919)
 Vestia roschitzi minima (Pavlović, 1912)
 Vestia roschitzi neubertiana Dedov, 2010
 Vestia roschitzi nordsieckiana Urbański, 1979
 Vestia roschitzi pygmaea (Jaeckel, 1954)
 Vestia roschitzi roschitzi (Brancsik, 1890)
 Vestia roschitzi trigonostoma (Pavlović, 1912)

References 

 Brancsik, K. (1890). Consignatio systematica specierum in itinere bosnensi anno 1888 per me collectarum, novaque data ad faunam molluscarum Bosniae ac Hercegovinae. Jahresheft des Naturwissenschaftliches Vereines des Trencsiner Comitates, 11/12 [1888/1889]: 68-76, pl. 1-2. Trencsin.
 Bank, R. A.; Neubert, E. (2017). Checklist of the land and freshwater Gastropoda of Europe. Last update: July 16th, 2017

Gastropods described in 1890
Gastropods of Europe
Clausiliidae